Bernardo II Nimi a Nkanga was a manikongo of the Kingdom of Kongo who ruled from 12 August 1614 until August 1615. He was the son of King Álvaro II.
Like the last two kings of Kongo, Bernardo II belonged to the Kwilu kanda or royal House of Kwilu.

References

External links
Strange Adventures of Andrew Battell at Googlebooks

See also
List of rulers of Kongo
Kingdom of Kongo

Manikongo of Kongo
17th-century African people
Year of birth unknown
Year of death unknown